Map wiki or wiki map may refer to any number of social media entities associated with mapping:

Wikimapia
 OpenStreetMap
 Google Map Maker

See also 
 Map
 Portal:Maps
 :Category:Web mapping
 Wikipedia:WikiProject Maps